Bunter may refer to:

Geography
Bunter sandstone, a type of red sandstone common in large parts of western and central Europe
Bunter (geology), a feature in geology

Sport
In baseball, a player who performs the action of bunting is called a bunter.
Blyde River Bunters, South Africa field hockey club

People
Billy Bunter,  a fictional character created by Charles Hamilton (using the nom de plume of Frank Richards).
Mervyn Bunter, valet to Lord Peter Wimsey, a fictional character created by Dorothy L. Sayers.
George Bunter, English rugby league footballer who played in the 1940s